Carla Azar is an American drummer from Huntsville, Alabama and member of the band Autolux. She also plays guitar, bass guitar, keyboards, and sings.

Azar played drums on Jack White's albums Blunderbuss, Lazaretto, and Boarding House Reach, and also played live on tour with him. From 2009–2011, she collaborated with painter Mark Whalen (also known as Kill Pixie) on art exhibitions, creating music for installation rooms. She had a role in the 2014 film Frank starring Michael Fassbender and Domhnall Gleeson.

Azar also played drums for Ednaswap for two albums and an EP. In addition, she played drums, as well as some percussion, on Come To Where I'm From (2000) by Joseph Arthur.

Career 

The band Autolux formed in 2001 in Los Angeles. She met Eugene Goreshter while writing the score for Accidental Death of an Anarchist, a play by Nobel Prize winner Dario Fo. She met Greg Edwards while he was playing in his previous band, Failure. In August 2000, Autolux made their debut, playing two shows at the Silverlake Lounge. On March 1, 2001, the band released a self-produced EP entitled Demonstration. It contained five songs recorded on an 8 track in their rehearsal space. After impressing record producer T Bone Burnett during a performance, Autolux signed to DMZ, a record label created by Burnett and the Coen Brothers.

In 2002, Azar and Josh Klinghoffer supported Vincent Gallo as his tour band in support of his album When. Besides drums, she played guitar and mellotron on the tour.

Azar played drums on The True False Identity (2005) by Burnett and Curtains (2005) by John Frusciante.

In May 2011, she began recording with Jack White on his first solo album, Blunderbuss. In 2012, she toured with White's touring band, The Peacocks.

In 2014, she co-starred as part of an ensemble cast in the film Frank, directed by Lenny Abrahamson, starring Michael Fassbender as Frank.

Discography

With Autolux
 Future Perfect (DMZ, 2004)
 Transit Transit (TBD, 2010)
 Pussy's Dead (Columbia/Sony, 2016)

Guest appearances

 1987 Wendy and Lisa, Wendy and Lisa
 1989 Fruit at the Bottom, Wendy and Lisa
 1990 Eroica, Wendy and Lisa
 1993 Dream Harder, The Waterboys
 1996 Vagabundo, Draco Rosa
 2000 Teddy Thompson, Teddy Thompson
 2001 Fan Dance, Sam Phillips
 2004  Curtains, John Frusciante
 2004 A Boot and a Shoe, Sam Phillips
 2006 The True False Identity, T Bone Burnett
 2007 A Year in the Wilderness, John Doe
 2007 War Stories, Unkle
 2008 More Stories, Unkle
 2009 A Woman a Man Walked By by PJ Harvey and John Parish (2009)
 2010 Where Did the Night Fall (Another Night Out), Unkle
 2011 The Lost Notebooks of Hank Williams
 2011 The People's Key,  Bright Eyes
 2012 Blunderbuss, Jack White 
 2014 Lazaretto, Jack White
 2014 Lost on the River, The New Basement Tapes
 2015 Aquaria, Boots
 2018 Boarding House Reach, Jack White
 2018 "TV Show", Glim Spanky
 2019 Desert Sessions Vol. 11 & 12, The Desert Sessions
 2019 WHO, The Who

Soundtracks
 2002 Divine Secrets of the Ya-Ya Sisterhood
 2002 Our Little Corner of the World: Music from Gilmore Girls
 2003 Crossing Jordan
 2003 The Soul of a Man
 2007 Across the Universe
 2007 I'm Not There
 2008 21
 2010 Eat Pray Love
 2011 Sucker Punch
 2014 Frank

References

External links
 

Living people
musicians from Huntsville, Alabama
American women drummers
American rock drummers
Ednaswap members
20th-century American drummers
20th-century American women musicians
20th-century American musicians
21st-century American women
Year of birth missing (living people)
Autolux members